Marat Vyacheslavovich Gubzhev (born 2 August 1992) is a Russian former football player.

Club career
He made his senior debut for PFC Spartak Nalchik on 31 August 2013 in the Russian Cup game against FC Alania Vladikavkaz.

External links
 
 
 Career summary by sportbox.ru

1992 births
Sportspeople from Nalchik
Living people
Russian footballers
Association football forwards
PFC Spartak Nalchik players
FC Saturn Ramenskoye players
PFC Krylia Sovetov Samara players
FC Arsenal Tula players